Egghead Rides Again is a 1937 Warner Bros. Merrie Melodies cartoon directed by Tex Avery. It was first released to theaters on July 17, 1937. The cartoon marks the first appearance of Egghead, a character who eventually appear in three more cartoons, "Daffy Duck and Egghead" (produced in 1937 and released in 1938), "A-Lad-In Bagdad" (1938) and "Count Me Out" (1938), both cartoons released in 1938, according to David Gerstein (an animation historian) and Michael Barrier.

Plot
Energetic Egghead is bouncing around, pretending to be a cowboy, until his noise-making gets him kicked out of the boarding house in which he is living by a clerk with a penchant for the minced oath "dad-burnit." While on the street he sees a discarded newspaper advertisement from a ranch in Wyoming, requesting a "cow-puncher." He applies, and, while there, goes through various training exercises, but fails them all. Egghead, having seen his apparent uselessness, begins to leave, but the lead cowboy decides to give him a job: cleaning up after the cows and horses.

Home media
VHS — Looney Tunes: The Collector's Edition - Vol. 8: Tex-Book Looney
LaserDisc – The Golden Age of Looney Tunes - Vol. 3
DVD — Kid Galahad (dubbed version)
Streaming — HBO Max (restored)

References

External links

Big Cartoon Database article 

1937 animated films
1937 films
Merrie Melodies short films
Films directed by Tex Avery
1930s Warner Bros. animated short films